Pristimantis myersi, also known as Myers' robber frog, is a species of frog in the family Strabomantidae. It is found in the Andes of southern Colombia and northern Ecuador.

References

myersi
Amphibians of the Andes
Amphibians of Colombia
Amphibians of Ecuador
Amphibians described in 1963
Taxa named by Doris Mable Cochran
Taxonomy articles created by Polbot